Liprin-alpha-1 is a protein that in humans is encoded by the PPFIA1 gene.

Function 

The protein encoded by this gene is a member of the LAR protein tyrosine phosphatase-interacting protein (liprin) family. Liprins interact with members of LAR family of transmembrane protein tyrosine phosphatases, which are known to be important for axon guidance and mammary gland development. This protein binds to the intracellular membrane-distal phosphatase domain of tyrosine phosphatase LAR, and appears to localize LAR to cell focal adhesions. This interaction may regulate the disassembly of focal adhesion and thus help orchestrate cell-matrix interactions. Alternatively spliced transcript variants encoding distinct isoforms have been described.

Interactions 

Protein tyrosine phosphatase, receptor type, f polypeptide (PTPRF), interacting protein (liprin), alpha 1 has been shown to interact with:

 ERC2, 
 GIT1,
 GRIP2, 
 PPFIBP1, 
 PPP2R5D, 
 PTPRD, 
 PTPRF,  and
 PTPRS.

References

Further reading

External links